Ballynahinch Lake is a freshwater lake in the west of Ireland. It is located in the Connemara area of County Galway.

Geography
The Twelve Bens mountain range lies to the north of the lake, with Benlettery directly overlooking. Ballynahinch Castle lies on the west shores.

Hydrology
Ballynahinch Lake is fed by Derryclare Lough at its eastern end (which is in turn fed by the neighboring Lough Inagh), and it drains to the south via the small Owenmore River – also called the Ballynahinch River, and not to be confused with the Owenmore River (County Mayo) – which in turn enters Bertraghboy Bay.

Natural history
Fish species in Ballynahinch Lake include salmon and brown trout. Ballynahinch Lake is part of The Twelve Bens/Garraun Complex Special Area of Conservation.

See also
List of loughs in Ireland
Ballynahinch Castle
Benlettery

References

Ballynahinch